"Hardly Hurts at All" is a 2003 single by Maria Arredondo from Maria Arredondo. This single is part from the second CD's version. Hardly Hurts at All peaked at number 5 in Norway.

Track listing
Norwegian CD Single
"Hardly Hurts At All" - 03:30
"On and On" - 04:33

Charts

References

Maria Arredondo songs
2003 singles
Songs written by Espen Lind
Songs written by Amund Bjørklund
2002 songs